Selamat is a village in the administrative area (regency) of Aceh Tamiang Regency in the province of Atjeh, Indonesia. As of 2010, the village had a population of 4681.

References

Populated places in Aceh